The Renfrewshire Cup was an annual association football competition between teams in the historic county of Renfrewshire in the west central Lowlands of Scotland. The final was generally a Renfrewshire derby contested between the two largest teams in the county, Paisley's St Mirren and Greenock side Morton.

Tournament
The tournament for the Renfrewshire Cup was contested between four teams from the county. St Mirren and Greenock Morton qualified automatically and each team competed with one of the finalist teams from a local amateur tournament, the Victoria Cup. The two victorious teams from these semi-finals went on to compete in the final game.

History
1991 was the last year in which Morton or St Mirren lost to other opposition. On this occasion amateurs Bellaire defeated St Mirren at Love Street with a 1–0 victory. Morton defeated them in the final.

The first tournament was held in 1879 and won by Thornliebank. 
In 1953/54 Babcock & Wilcox were the only team outwith St Mirren and Morton to win it since Port Glasgow were triumphant in 1909.

It was last contested in 2014, when St Mirren won the trophy at Cappielow, beating Morton 1-0.

Former holders

The number of times each team has won the Renfrewshire Cup:
 St Mirren - 55
 Greenock Morton - 52
 Abercorn - 5
 Port Glasgow Athletic - 5
 Arthurlie - 2
 Thornliebank - 2
 Babcock & Wilcox - 1

References

External links
Full record of the Renfrewshire Cup at Scottish Football Historical Archive

Football in Renfrewshire
Football cup competitions in Scotland
Football in Inverclyde
St Mirren F.C.
Greenock Morton F.C.
Defunct football cup competitions in Scotland